John Henry Warren (ca 1812 – April 28, 1885) was an English-born merchant and politician in Newfoundland. He represented Bonavista Bay from 1852 to 1869 and from 1874 to 1878 and Trinity Bay from 1871 to 1874 in the Newfoundland and Labrador House of Assembly.

He was born in Devon, the son of William Warren, and is known to have been operating with a partner in the fish and wholesale-retail trade in St. John's in the 1830s. In 1841, he established his own business. Warren served in the Executive Council as surveyor general and chairman of the Board of Works. He was defeated in the 1878 general election and was named to the Legislative Council in 1879. He died at Belgrave Terrace, Torquay in England in 1885 while still a member of the council.

His daughter Laura married Charles R. Bowring who also served in the assembly and Legislative Council.

References 

Members of the Newfoundland and Labrador House of Assembly
Members of the Legislative Council of Newfoundland
1885 deaths
Year of birth uncertain
Newfoundland Colony people
English emigrants to pre-Confederation Newfoundland